Damien K. A. Griffith is a Barbadian politician who served as a senator. He was a member of the Committee for Selection in 2008 and named the best debater  at the University of the West Indies, Cave Hill Campus.

References 

Year of birth missing (living people)
Living people
Barbadian politicians
University of the West Indies alumni